Christiansbrunn (Christian's Spring) is the name of two communities established in Pennsylvania.

Community beginnings 

A community of Single Brothers was established by the Moravian Unity in the Lehigh Valley of Pennsylvania in 1747. It was based on communal ideals developed by church leader Nicholas Ludwig Zinzendorf. The community was originally named Albrechtsbrunn, the Spring of Albrecht, an early brother. Water power was used to power a grist and saw mill which burned in 1749. Only the saw mill was rebuilt. The spring also supplied water to other industries including a milk house, distillery and brewery. Much of the community's  were also farmed and the surplus crops were used to support the Moravians’ vast missionary effort. At its height the community had nearly three hundred cattle and six teams of oxen.

Named for Moravian spiritual leader 

The community was renamed Christiansbrunn and formally dedicated on August 4, 1749, in honor of Christian Renatus von Zinzendorf, head of the Single Brothers. He was then living at Herrnhaag in Germany but was expected to come live at the community. Several dozen men who left Herrnhaag due to scandalous events there later settled at Christiansbrunn. They continued the cult of the community's namesake much to the dismay of church leaders in Bethlehem and Christiansbrunn remained a source of embarrassment to the church due to its all-male population.

The elder Zinzendorf was also expected to come to America to live and a manor house for him was constructed at the nearby Moravian community of Nazareth. That building, Nazareth Hall,  still exists. Peach trees, Christian Renatus' favorite fruit, were planted so they would bear fruit by the time he arrived. However he died in 1752 in London. A belief among the brothers that Christian Renatus' spirit was in the spring itself was expressed in a poem of the time.  Visitors to the site often commented on the tame trout that lived in the spring.

Center of trades and education 

In 1757 sixteen boys from Bethlehem were sent to Christiansbrunn to learn trades that including farming, shoe making and writing (for maintaining community records). Silk making was also started, as well as  rifle making. Christian Oerter, a noted American gun maker, made long rifles there and is buried in the Moravian Cemetery outside Nazareth. Hemp and flax were processed and woven. Music was also important, both singing and instrumental playing; the community had a trombone choir.

Community disbanded 

In 1771, Christiansbrunn was the last Moravian community in the United States to have its communal economy disbanded. The community continued until officially disbanded by the church on April 1, 1796. The remaining farming operations were placed in the hands of family men while "several of the deteriorated bachelors were given a mere asylum there under watchful restraint" in the words of a late nineteenth-century historian who blamed conditions in the community on alcoholism and a "decadence that became hopeless."

Later visits 

A visitor in 1862 recalled how the community had looked forty years earlier: "The red-tiled roofs, the solid stone masonry of most of the buildings, and the peculiar structure of others, in which the frame is filled in with mortar mixed with cut straw, denoted at once the foreign origin of its founders." The church sold the property in the 1840s when much of its once vast holdings in the Lehigh Valley were dispersed. The remaining buildings were photographed in the 1880s.  
A visitor in 1914 noted that only a stone house remained of the original settlement and that even the spring was covered by a recent shed. 
As of January, 2009, those two structures remained. The stone building was the Familienhaus in which lived two married couples who oversaw the community of single brothers.

References

Further reading 

Sawyer, Edwin A.  (1988) Christian Spring,  Nazareth, Pa.  1988. Moravian Hall Square Museum Craft Shop. 
Henry, James. Christian Spring. Transactions of the Moravian Historical Society, Vol. 1, No. 2 (1868 - 1876).
Jacobson, Henry A. Revolutionary Notes on Friedensthal, Christian Spring, and Nazareth. Transactions of the Moravian Historical Society, Vol. II, No. 1 (1877-1886).
Beck, Clara A. The Single Brethren of the Moravian Church in the Barony of Nazareth. Transactions of the Moravian Historical Society, Vol. XI, No. 2 (1931-1936)

External links 
The Lost Village of Christian Spring
The Hermitage and Mahantango Heritage Center

Pre-statehood history of Pennsylvania
History of Christianity in the United States
Settlements of the Moravian Church
History of the Moravian Church
Moravian settlement in Pennsylvania
Sexuality in Christianity
Spiritual evolution
Spiritual teachers
Spiritual retreats